Refvik or Refvika is a village in Kinn Municipality in Vestland county, Norway.

The village lies between the lake Refvikvatnet and the ocean. Refvik has a population (2001) of 126 people.

The Tornado Måløy FK association football team sometimes plays in Refvika.

References

Villages in Vestland
Kinn